Ralph Adolph Shropshire (January 4, 1911 - March 11, 1973) was a professional baseball catcher in the Negro leagues. He played with the St. Louis Stars in 1937.

References

External links
 and Seamheads

St. Louis Stars (1937) players
1911 births
1973 deaths
Baseball catchers
Baseball players from Missouri
People from Paris, Missouri
20th-century African-American sportspeople